(Main list of acronyms)


 g – (s) Gram
 G – (s) Gauss – (i) General Audiences (movie rating)

G0–9
 G1 – (s) Assistant Chief-of-Staff, Personnel
 G2 – (s) Assistant Chief-of-Staff, Intelligence
 G3 – many, including Heckler & Koch G3; see entry – (s) Assistant Chief-of-Staff, Operations and Plans
 G4
 (i) Generation Four PowerPC microprocessor
 (s) Assistant Chief-of-Staff, Logistics
 G5
 (i) Generation Five PowerPC microprocessor
 Group of Five conferences (US college sports, especially football)
 (s) Assistant Chief-of-Staff, Public Affairs
 G6
 (s) Assistant Chief-of-Staff, Information Technology
 (i) Group of 6 (France, Germany, United States, Japan, United Kingdom, Italy) (1975)
 G7 – (s) Assistant Chief-of-Staff, Training – (i) Group of 7 (G6 + Canada) (1976)
 G8 – (s) Assistant Chief-of-Staff, Finance – (i) Group of 8 (G7 + Russia) (1998)
 G9 – (s) Assistant Chief-of-Staff, Civil-Military Co-operation (CIMIC)
 G10 – (i) Group of 10 (G7 + Belgium, Netherlands, Sweden, Switzerland; numbering 11 in fact)
 G15 – (i) Group of 15 (subset of G77, formed 1989: Algeria, Argentina, Brazil, Chile, Egypt, India, Indonesia, Jamaica, Kenya, Nigeria, Malaysia, Mexico, Peru, Senegal, Sri Lanka, Venezuela and Zimbabwe; currently numbers 17)
 G20 – (i) Group of 20 (G8 + Argentina, Australia, Brazil, China, India, Indonesia, Mexico, Saudi Arabia, South Africa, South Korea, Turkey + current European Union presiding country) (1999)
 G24 – (i) Group of 24 (subset of G77, formed 1971: Algeria, Argentina, Brazil, Colombia, Côte d'Ivoire, Democratic Republic of the Congo, Egypt, Ethiopia, Gabon, Ghana, Guatemala, India, Iran, Lebanon, Mexico, Nigeria, Pakistan, Peru, Philippines, South Africa, Syria, Sri Lanka, Trinidad and Tobago and Venezuela)
 G77 – (i) Group of 77 (issued from the United Nations Conference on Commerce and Development, 1964; currently numbers 133)

GA
 Ga – (s) Gallium – Gigaannum
 GA – (s) Gabon (ISO 3166 digram) –  The Gambia (FIPS 10-4 country code) – (i) Gamblers Anonymous – Georgia (postal symbol) – Gigaampere – Goa (Indian state code)
 GAAR – (a) General Anti-Avoidance Rule (tax evasion)
 GAB – (s) Gabon (ISO 3166 trigram)
 GABA – (i) Gamma-AminoButyric Acid
 GAD – (a) Generalized Anxiety Disorder
 GAF – (i) Garfield and Friends
 GALCIT – (a) Guggenheim Aeronautical Laboratory, California Institute of Technology
 GAO – (i) U.S. Government Accountability Office
 GAW – (i) Global Atmospheric Watch

GB
 GB – (s) Gabon (FIPS 10-4 country code) – United Kingdom of Great Britain and Northern Ireland (ISO 3166 digram) [glamour boy 7-9/10]
 GBBC – (i) Great (Global) Backyard Bird Count
 GBE – (i) Knight/Dame Grand Cross of the Order of the British Empire
 GBH
 (i) Great Bash Heel (Japanese professional wrestling stable)
 Gregory Bonner Hale (British design and advertising agency)
 Grievous bodily harm
 GBP – (s) United Kingdom pound sterling (ISO 4217 currency code)
 GBR – (s) United Kingdom of Great Britain and Northern Ireland (ISO 3166 trigram)
 GBU – (i) Glide-Bomb Unit – Global Business Unit(s)

GC
 GC
 (s) East Germany (NATO country code; obsolete 1990)
 (i) General classification (cycling)
 General counsel
 George Cross (British civil decoration)
  (s) Gigacoulomb [Grindr cruise]
 GCA – (i) Graduate in Claims Administration
 GCCS – (i/a) Global Command and Control System ("geeks")
 GCD – see entry
 GCF – (i) Greatest Common Factor
 GCI – (i) Ground-controlled interception
 GCN – (i) Gamma-ray burst Coordination Network
 GCS – (i) Global Coordinate System
 GCSE – (i) General Certificate of Secondary Education (UK)
 G-CSF – (i) Granulocyte Colony-Stimulating Factor

GD
 gd – (s) Scottish Gaelic language (ISO 639-1 code)
 Gd – (s) Gadolinium
 GD – (s) Grenada (ISO 3166 digram)
 GDC
 (i) Game Developers Conference
 General Dental Council
 GDL – (i) Game Definition Language
 GDP
 (i) General Dental Practitioner (UK)
 Gross Domestic Product
 GDPR
 (i) General Data Protection Regulation (EU law)
 Gross domestic product of region
 GDR – (i) German Democratic Republic (cf. DDR)
 GDR – (i) General Distribution Release (Microsoft Term for a software service release; between Hotfix and Service Pack)
 GDW – (i) Game Designers Workshop

GE
 Ge – (s) Germanium
 GE
 (i) General Electric
 Genetic Engineering (cf. GM)
 (s) Georgia (ISO 3166 digram)
 GEBCO – (a) General Bathymetric Chart of the Oceans
 GEC – (i) Great Engineering Challenge
 GED – (i) General Educational Development (high school equivalency credential in the U.S. and Canada)
 GEEP – (i) Geophysical Equipment Exploration Platform
 GEICO – (p/a) Government Employees Insurance Company (GUY-coh)
 GEL
 (s) Georgian lari (ISO 4217 currency code)
 Gilbert and Ellice Islands (ISO 3166 trigram; obsolete 1977)
 GEMA
 (a) Gas and Electricity Markets Authority
 Georgia Emergency Management Agency
 (p) Gesellschaft für musikalische Aufführungs- und mechanische Vervielfältigungsrechte (German performance rights organisation)
 (a) Global Engine Manufacturing Alliance
 GEN – (s) Full General (four stars) in the U.S. Army
 GEO
 (a) Geostationary Earth Orbit
 (s) Georgia (ISO 3166 trigram)
 GEOS – (i) Graphical Environment Operating System
 GEQ – (s) Equatorial Guinea (IOC trigram, but not FIFA or ISO 3166)
 GER – (s) Germany (IOC and FIFA trigram, but not ISO 3166)
 Gestapo – (p) GEheime STAatsPOlizei (German "secret state police")
 GeV – (s) Gigaelectron-volt
 GEV – (i) Ground Effect Vehicle

GF
 GF
 (s) French Guiana (ISO 3166 digram)
 Gigafarad
 GFCF
 (i) Gluten-free, casein-free diet
 Gross fixed capital formation
 GFCI – (i) Ground Fault Circuit Interruptor (aka GFI)
 GFDL – (i) GNU Free Documentation License
 GFE
 (i) Girlfriend experience (used in escort services)
 Good Faith Estimate
 Government Furnished Equipment
 GFI – (i) Ground Fault Interruptor (aka GFCI)
 GFL – (i) German Football League (Germany's Bundesliga for American football; the English-language name is used in German without translation)
 GFN – (i) Global Footprint Network
 GFW
 (i) Global Force Wrestling – either the original incarnation or Impact Wrestling, which was briefly known under the name
 (p) Great Firewall of China (cf. Internet censorship in China)
 GFY – (i) "good for you" or "go fuck yourself", depending on the context (Internet chat)

GG
 GG – (s) Georgia (FIPS 10-4 country code)
 GGK – Good God Karma
 GGWP – Good Game Well Played
 GGP
 (i) General Game Playing

GH
 GH – (s) Ghana (ISO 3166 digram; FIPS 10-4 country code) – Gigahenry
 GHA – (s) Ghana (ISO 3166 trigram)
 GHB – (i) gamma-Hydroxybutyric acid
 GHC – (s) Ghanaian cedi (ISO 4217 currency code)

GI
 Gi – (s) Gibi
 GI – (i) Galvanised Iron –  Gastro-Intestinal – General Issue – (s) Gibraltar (ISO 3166 digram; FIPS 10-4 territory code) – (i) Government Issue - (i) Global Illumination
 GIB – (s) Gibraltar (ISO 3166 trigram)
 GIF – (a) Graphics Interchange Format
 GIG – (a) Global Information Grid
 GIGN – (i) Groupe d'intervention de la Gendarmerie nationale (French, "National Gendarmerie Intervention Group'), French police tactical unit
 GIGO – (a) Garbage In Garbage Out (computing)
 GIMP – (a) GNU Image Manipulation Program
 GIN – (s) Guinea (ISO 3166 trigram) – (a) Guidelines International Network
 GIP – (s) Gibraltar pound (ISO 4217 currency code)
 GIS – (i) Geographic Information System – (i) Google Image Search
 GISS – (a/i) General Impression of Size and Shape – Goddard Institute for Space Studies

GJ
 GJ – (s) Gigajoule – Grenada (FIPS 10-4 country code) – Gujarat (Indian state code)
 GJD – (i) Geocentric Julian Day

GK
 GK – (s) Gigakelvin – Guernsey (FIPS 10-4 territory code)

GL
 gl – (s) Galician language (ISO 639-1 code)
 GL
 (s) Gigalitre
 (i) Graphics Language
 (s) Greenland (ISO 3166 digram; FIPS 10-4 territory code)
 (i) Grenade Launcher
 gla – (s) Scottish Gaelic language (ISO 639-2 code)
 GLAAD – (a) Gay and Lesbian Alliance Against Defamation
 GLAC – (a) General Ledger Accounting Code
 GLAST – (a) Gamma-ray Large Area Space Telescope
 GLBA – (i) Gramm-Leach-Bliley Act
 GLC – (i) Gas-liquid chromatography
 gle – (s) Irish language (ISO 639-2 code)
 glg – (s) Galician language (ISO 639-2 code)
 GLINT
 (a) Gallium-arsenide Laser Illuminator for Night TV
 Gated Laser Illuminator for Narrow Television
 (p) Gated Laser Intensifier (tape)
 Gospel Literature International
 Graphical Linux Installation Tool
 GLONASS – (a) Global'naya navigatsionnaya sputnikovaya sistema (Russian Глоба́льная Навигацио́нная Спу́тниковая Систе́ма, "Global Navigation Satellite System")
 GLP – (s) Guadeloupe (ISO 3166 trigram)
 GLUT – (a/i) OpenGL Utility Toolkit
 glv – (s) Manx language (ISO 639-2 code)
 GLV – (i) Gained Life Value

GM
 Gm – (s) Gigametre
 GM
 (s) The Gambia (ISO 3166 digram)
 (i) GameMaster (role-playing)
 General Motors
 Genetically Modified
 (s) Germany (FIPS 10-4 country code)
 (i) Guru Meditation (computing)
 GMAC
 (i) General Motors Acceptance Corporation, the original name of the company now known as Ally Financial
 Graduate Management Admission Council
 G-MAC
 (i) Great Midwest Athletic Conference
 GMB
 (s) The Gambia (ISO 3166 trigram)
 (i) General, Municipal, Boilermakers (and Allied Trade Union)
 GmbH – (i) Gesellschaft mit beschränkter Haftung (German, "Company with limited liability")
 GMC
 (i) U.K. General Medical Council
 Gospel Music Channel
 GMD – (s) Gambian dalasi (ISO 4217 currency code)
 GMFSC – (i) Ground Mobile Forces Satellite Communications
 GMI
 (i) Generic Model Interface
 Geometry Model Instance
 GML
 Generalized Markup Language
 Geography Markup Language
 Game Maker Language
 Graph Modelling Language
 Graphical Motion Language
 GUI Markup Language
 GMO – (i) Genetically Modified Organism
 GMPCS – (i) Global Mobile Personal Communications by Satellite
 GMT
 (i) Giant Magellan Telescope
 Greenwich Mean Time

GN
 gn – (s) Guaraní language (ISO 639-1 code)
 GN
 (s) Giganewton
 Guinea (ISO 3166 digram)
 GNAS – (p) Grand National Archery Society
 GNB – (s) Guinea-Bissau (ISO 3166 trigram)
 GNC
 (i) "G&C Records" NetLabel
 General Nutrition Centers (US sports nutrition retailer branded as GNC)
 GNF – (s) Guinean franc (ISO 4217 currency code)
 GNOME – (a) GNU Network Object Model Environment
 GNP – (i) Gross National Product
 GNQ – (s) Equatorial Guinea (ISO 3166 trigram)
 GnRH – (p) Gonadotropin-Releasing Hormone
 GNU – (a) GNU's Not Unix

GO
 GO – (s) Glorioso Islands (FIPS 10-4 territory code)
 GOA
(s) General of the Army (United States only)
 (i) Gun Owners of America
 GOAT – (s) Greatest of all time (LL Cool J album title)
 GOC – (i) General Officer Commanding
 GOES – (a) Geostationary Operational Environmental Satellite
 GOP – (i) Grand Old Party
 GOP – (a) God of Porn
 gorp – (a) granola, oats, raisins, peanuts (another name for trail mix), probably a backronym
 GOSC – (a/i) General Officer Steering Committee
 GOSH – (a) Great Ormond Street Hospital
 GOSP – (a) Gas/Oil Separation Plant
 GOTS – (a) Government off-the-shelf
 GOWI – (a) Get On With It
 GOYADIN – (a) Get Off Your Arse, Do It Now (anti-procrastination mantra)

GP
 GP – (i) General Practitioner – General Purpose – Grand Prix – (s) Guadeloupe (ISO 3166 digram; FIPS 10-4 territory code)
 GPA – (i) Grade Point Average
 GPC – (i) Global Path Cache
 GPG – (i) GNU Privacy Guard
 GPIB – (i) General-Purpose Instrumentation/Interface Bus
 GPL – (i) GNU General Public License
 GPMP – (i) General Purpose Macro Processor
 GPO – (i) General Post Office
 GPPC – (i) Genetics and Public Policy Center
 GPR – (i) Ground-Penetrating Radar
 GPS – (i) General Problem Solver – Global Positioning System
 GPT – (i) GEC-Plessey Telecommunications – General Purpose Technology – Get Paid To website
 GPU
 (i) Gosudarstvennoye Politicheskoye Upravlenie (Russian Государственное Политическое Управление, "State Political Administration") (1922–1934)
 (i) Graphics Processor Unit

GQ
 GQ
 (s) Equatorial Guinea (ISO 3166 digram)
 (i) Gentlemen's Quarterly (the original name of the magazine now known simply as GQ)
 (s) Guam (FIPS 10-4 territory code)

GR
 GR – (s) Greece (FIPS 10-4 country code; ISO 3166 digram) – Hail (METAR Code)
 GRAIL – (i) Gravity Recovery and Interior Laboratory
 GRAS – (i) Generally recognized as safe (FDA list)
 GRB – (i) Gamma-ray burst
 GRC – (s) Greece (ISO 3166 trigram)
 GRD – (s) Grenada (ISO 3166 trigram)
 GRE
(i) Graduate Record Examination
(s) Greece (IOC and FIFA trigram, but not ISO 3166)
 grep – (a) [search] Globally for Regular Expression, Print [lines]
 GRid – Global Release Identifier, a music industry identifier from the RIAA and IFPI
 GRID – (a) Gay-Related Immune Deficiency (original name of AIDS)
 GriT – (a) Girl raised in Texas (Woman presenting firm southern traits/beliefs)
 GRL – (s) Greenland (ISO 3166 trigram)
 GRN
(s) Grenada (IOC and FIFA trigram, but not ISO 3166)
(i) Goods received note
 grn – (s) Guaraní language (ISO 639-2 code)
 GRP – (i) Graphite-reinforced plastic, see Carbon-fiber-reinforced polymer
 GRU – (i) Glavnoje Razvedyvatel'noje Upravlenije/Главное Разведывательное Управление (Russian, "Main Intelligence Directorate" [of the former Soviet and now Russian armed forces])

GS
 Gs – (s) Gigasecond
 GS
 (i) General Schedule (US civil service pay scale)
 General Support
 (s) Gigasiemens
 South Georgia and the South Sandwich Islands (ISO 3166 digram)
 GSR – (i) Gun Shot Residue
 GS-R – (i) General Support-Reinforcing
 GSA – (i) U.S. General Services Administration
 GSD – (i) Graphical Situation Display
 GSG
 (i) German Sport Guns
 Global Scenario Group (former environmental research organization)
 Grenzschutzgruppe (German, "Border Guard Group" — Germany's GSG 9 counterterrorist unit was originally a special branch of the border police) 
 GSGB – (God send glamour boy 9-10/10)
 GSK – (p) GlaxoSmithKline [good sexual karma]
 GSM
 (i) General Service Medal
 Grams per Square Metre (paper thickness; properly g/m2)
 Ground Station Module
 Groupe spécial mobile (French, "Special Mobile Group"; official expansion is now Global System for Mobile Communications)
 GSN – (a/i) Game Show Network
 GSO – (i) General Services Officer (U.S. Department of State)
 GSOH – (i) Good Sense Of Humour
 GSP – Georges St-Pierre (Canadian MMA fighter)
 GSS – (i) Generic Security Services
 GST – (i) Goods and Services Tax (Australia, Canada, and other countries)
 GSW – (i) Gunshot wound

GT
 GT –  (s) Gigatesla – (i) Gran Turismo – Grand Touring – (s) Guatemala (FIPS 10-4 country code; ISO 3166 digram)
 GTA – (i) Grand Theft Auto
 GTB – (i) Get to bed, namely to get a new job after a long time of searching, usually following a phone call
 GTC – (i) Gran Telescopio Canarias (Spanish, Canaries Great Telescope)
 GTD – (i) Getting Things Done
 GTFO – "Get the f**k out!"
 GTG – (i) Good To Go (Internet chat)
 GTK – (i) Good To Know (Internet chat)
 GTGN – (i) Getty Thesaurus of Geographic Names
 GTM – (s) Guatemala (ISO 3166 trigram)
 GTQ – (s) Guatemalan quetzal (ISO 4217 currency code)
 GTV – (s) Gross Tumor Volume quetzal (ISO 4217 currency code)

GU
 gu – (s) Gujarati language (ISO 639-1 code)
 GU – (s) Guam (postal symbol; ISO 3166 digram)
 GUA – (s) Guatemala (IOC and FIFA trigram, but not ISO 3166)
 GUF – (s) French Guiana (ISO 3166 trigram)
 GUI – (a) Graphical user interface ("goo-ey")
 GUILT – (a) Gangliated Utrophin Immuno Latency Toxin
 guj – (s) Gujarati language (ISO 639-2 code)
 GULCR – (i) Grupo de Usuarios de Linux de Costa Rica
 Gulag – (p) Glavnoye Upravleniye ispravitelno-trudovykh LAGerei i kolonii (Russian Главное Управление Исправительно—Трудовых Лагерей и колоний, "Main Directorate of Corrective Labour Camps")
 GUM
 (a) Glavnyi Universalnyi Magazin (Russian Главный Универсальный Магазин, "Main Department Store"; known in Soviet times as Gosudarstvennyi Universalnyi Magazin/Государственный Универсальный Магазин, "State Department Store")
 (s) Guam (ISO 3166 trigram)
 Guide to the expression of Uncertainty in Measurement
 GUT – (a) Grand Unification Theory

GV
 gv – (s) Manx language (ISO 639-1 code)
 GV – (s) Gigavolt – Guinea (FIPS 10-4 country code)

GW
 GW – (i) Games Workshop – Germ Warfare – (s) Gigawatt – (i) Guided Weapon – (s) Guinea-Bissau (ISO 3166 digram)
 GWARS – (p) Ground Warfare System (simulation)
 GWAS – (p) Grand Western Archery Society
 GWOT – (i) Global War on Terrorism
 GWS – (i) Gulf War Syndrome – Greater Western Sydney

GX
 GXA – (p) Global XML Web Services Architecture
 GXE – (s) Gene–environment interaction
 GXF – (p) General Exchange Format
 GXH – (i) IATA code of Gannan Xiahe Airport
 GXL – (p) Graph eXchange Language
 GXM – (p) Matrox Graphics eXpansion Module
 GXP – (p) Grid Exit Point - (i) Global Xchange Programme - (i) Indication of highest performance level on some Pontiac vehicles
 GxP – (i) Good X Practice  (X can mean: clinical, manufacturing, pharmaceutical, etc.)
 GXY – (i) IATA code of Greeley-Weld County Airport

GY
 GY  – (s) Guyana (FIPS 10-4 country code; ISO 3166 digram)
 GYD – (s) Guyana dollar (ISO 4217 currency code)
 GYY – (s) Gary/Chicago International Airport (IATA Airport Code)

GZ
 GZ – (s) Gaza Strip (FIPS 10-4 territory code) – (i) Ground Zero
 GZK – (i) Greisen-Zatsepin-Kuzmin cut-off (cosmic ray energies)

Acronyms G